Mount Pleasant House is a residence built in 1875-76 for William Hayes Perry in Boyle Heights. It was designed by Kysor & Mathews in Italianate style. The home was relocated in 1975 to the Heritage Square Museum in the Montecito Heights section of Los Angeles, California. It was listed on the National Register of Historic Places in 1976.

Perry organized Los Angeles's first gas company, the Los Angeles Gas Company, and served as president and General Manager
for five years. He served on the City Council in 1866 and 1869.  From 1879 on he served as Manager of the Los Angeles City Water Company for 25 years.

It was later the home of judge Stephan C. Hubbell.

In 1935 the house became a home for unwed mothers.

See also
 List of Registered Historic Places in Los Angeles

References

Italianate architecture in California
Victorian architecture in California
Houses on the National Register of Historic Places in Los Angeles
Houses completed in 1876
Historic house museums in California
Montecito Heights, Los Angeles